Cezlak is a small settlement on the southern slope of the Pohorje range in the Municipality of Slovenska Bistrica in northeastern Slovenia. The area is part of the traditional region of Styria. It is now included with the rest of the municipality in the Drava Statistical Region.

Cultural heritage
There is a small roadside chapel in the settlement. It was built in 1898.

Mineralogy

Since the beginning of 20th century, a granodiorite quarry has been operating there, once used mostly for setts for roads and squares. The only known deposit of cizlakite (quartz monzogabbro, a green plutonic rock) in the world has been found near Cezlak.

References

External links
Cezlak at Geopedia

Populated places in the Municipality of Slovenska Bistrica